The Federal Reserve Bank of San Francisco Seattle  Branch is one of four branches of the Federal Reserve Bank of San Francisco.
The branch is located at 2700 Naches Ave SW in Renton, Washington, a suburb south of Seattle. Until 2008, the branch was headquartered at the Federal Reserve Bank Building in Downtown Seattle, which had been built in 1951 for the branch.

Current board of directors
The following people are on the board of directors as of 2021:

Appointed by the Federal Reserve Bank

Appointed by the board of governors

See also

 Federal Reserve Act
 Federal Reserve System
 Federal Reserve Bank
 Federal Reserve Districts
 Federal Reserve Branches
 Federal Reserve Bank of San Francisco Los Angeles Branch
 Federal Reserve Bank of San Francisco Portland Branch
 Federal Reserve Bank of San Francisco Salt Lake City Branch
 Federal Reserve Bank of San Francisco Building (San Francisco, California)
 Structure of the Federal Reserve System

References

Federal Reserve branches